Adamas University is a private university located on Barrackpore-Barasat road in Barasat, West Bengal, India. It  has been established and incorporated by The Adamas University Act, 2014 (West Bengal Act IV of 2014) passed by the West Bengal Legislative Assembly. Adamas University is recognized by the University Grants Commission, offering several undergraduate, postgraduate & doctoral degree courses in Engineering, Technology, Science, Agriculture, Pharmacy, Humanities, Law, Media and Management studies.

References

External links
 Official Website

 

Private universities in India
Universities in Kolkata
Universities and colleges in North 24 Parganas district
Educational institutions established in 2014
2014 establishments in West Bengal